This is a list of fossil primates—extinct primates for which a fossil record exists. Primates are generally thought to have evolved from a small, unspecialized mammal, which probably fed on insects and fruits. However, the precise source of the primates remains controversial and even their arboreal origin has recently been questioned. As it has been suggested, many other mammal orders are arboreal too, but they have not developed the same characteristics as primates. Nowadays, some well known genera, such as Purgatorius and Plesiadapis, thought to be the most ancient primates for a long time, are not usually considered as such by recent authors, who tend to include them in the new order Plesiadapiformes, within superorder Euarchontoglires. Some, to avoid confusions, employ the unranked term Euprimates, which excludes Plesiadapiformes. That denomination is not used here.

There is an academic debate on the time the first primates appeared. One of the earliest probable primate fossils is the problematic Altiatlasius koulchii, perhaps an Omomyid, but perhaps a non-Primate Plesiadapiform, which lived in Morocco, during the Paleocene, around 60 Ma. However, other studies, including molecular clock studies, have estimated the origin of the primate branch to have been in the mid-Cretaceous period, around 85 Ma, that is to say, in the time previous to the extinction of dinosaurs and the successful mammal radiation. Nevertheless, there seems to be a consensus about the monophyletic origin of the order, although the evidence is not clear. 

The order Primates, established by Linnaeus in 1758, includes humans and their immediate ancestors. However, contrarily to the common opinion, most primates do not have especially large brains. Brain size is a derived character, which only appeared with genus Homo, and was lacking in the first hominid. In fact, hominid encephalization quotient is only 1.5 Ma more recent than that of some dolphin species. The encephalization quotient of some cetaceans is therefore higher than that of most primates, including the nearest relatives of humans, such as Australopithecus.

This list follows partly from Walter Carl Hartwig's 2002 book The Fossil Primate Record and John G. Fleagle's 2013 book Primate Adaptation and Evolution (3rd edition). Parentheses around authors' names (and dates) indicates a change in generic name for the fossil, as stated in the International Code of Zoological Nomenclature (ICZN). Since the publication of the book as well as the creation of this article, new fossil taxon have been discovered that has helped improved the taxonomy among primates in general.

Strepsirrhini

Infraorder Adapiformes

Adapiformes, incertae sedis 
 Sulaimanius Gunnell et al., 2012
 Sulaimanius arifi (Gunnell et al., 2008)

Adapoidea 

 Ekgmowechashalidae Szalay, 1976
 Bugtilemur Marivaux et al., 2001
 Bugtilemur mathesoni Marivaux et al., 2001
 Ekgmowechashala Macdonald, 1963
 Ekgmowechashala philotau Macdonald, 1963
 Ekgmowechashala zancanellai Samuels, Albright & Fremd, 2015
 Gatanthropus Ni et al., 2016
 Gatanthropus micros Ni et al., 2016
 Muangthanhinius Marivaux et al., 2006
 Muangthanhinius siami Marivaux et al., 2006
 Notharctidae Trouessart, 1879
 Notharctinae Trouessart, 1879
 Cantius Simons, 1962
 Cantius abditus Gingerich & Simmons, 1977
 Cantius angulatus Cope, 1875
 Cantius antediluvius Kihm, 1992
 Cantius eppsi Cooper, 1932
 Cantius frugivorus Cope, 1875
 Cantius lohseorum Robinson, 2016
 Cantius mckennai Gingerich & Simons, 1977
 Cantius nuniensis Cope, 1881
 Cantius ralstoni Matthew, 1915
 Cantius savagei Gingerich, 1977
 Cantius torresi Gingerich, 1986
 Copelemur Gingerich & Simons, 1977
 Copelemur australotutus Beard, 1988
 Copelemur praetutus Gazin, 1962
 Copelemur tutus Cope, 1877
 Hesperolemur Gunnell, 1995
 Hesperolemur actius Gunnell, 1995
 Megaceralemur Robinson, 2016
 Megaceralemur trigonodus (Matthew, 1915)
 Megaceralemur matthewi Robinson, 2016
 Notharctus Leidy, 1870
 Notharctus pugnax Granger & Gregory, 1917
 Notharctus robustior Leidy, 1870
 Notharctus tenebrosus Leidy, 1870
 Notharctus venticolus Osborn, 1902
 Pelycodus Cope, 1875
 Pelycodus danielsae Froehlich & Lucas, 1991
 Pelycodus jarrovii Cope, 1874
 Pinolophus Robinson, 2016
 Pinolophus meikei Robinson, 2016
 Smilodectes Wortman, 1903
 Smilodectes gingerichi Beard, 1988
 Smilodectes gracilis Marsh, 1871
 Smilodectes mcgrewi Gingerich, 1979
 Cercamoniinae Gingerich, 1975
 Agerinia Crusafont-Pairo & Golpe-Posse, 1973
 Agerinia marandati Femenias-Gual, Minwer-Barakat, Marigó, Poyatos-Moré, and Moyà-Solà, 2017 
 Agerinia roselli Crusafont-Pairo & Golpe-Posse, 1973
 Agerinia smithorum Femenias-Gual, Minwer-Barakat, Marigó, and Moyà-Solà, 2016
 Anchomomys Stehlin, 1916
 Anchomomys crocheti Godinot, 1988
 Anchomomys gaillardi Stehlin, 1916
 Anchomomys pygmaeus Rütimeyer, 1890
 Anchomomys quercy Stehlin, 1916
 Barnesia Thalmann, 1994
 Barnesia hauboldi Thalmann, 1994
 Buxella Godinot, 1988
 Buxella magna Godinot, 1988
 Buxella prisca Godinot, 1988
 Donrussellia Szalay, 1976
 Donrussellia gallica Russell, Louis & Savage, 1967
 Donrussellia louisi
 Donrussellia magna
 Donrussellia provincialis
 Donrussellia russelli
 Mazateronodon Marigó, Minwer-Barakat, & Moyà-Solà, 2010
 Mazateronodon endemicus Marigó, Minwer-Barakat, & Moyà-Solà, 2010
 Panobius Russell & Gingerich, 1987
 Panobius afridi Russell & Gingerich, 1987
 Periconodon Stehlin, 1916
 Periconodon helleri Schwartz et al., 1983
 Periconodon helveticus Rütimeyer, 1891
 Periconodon huerzeleri Gingerich, 1977
 Periconodon jaegeri Godinot, 1988
 Periconodon lemoinei Gingerich, 1977
 Protoadapis Lemoine, 1878
 Protoadapis angustidens Filhol, 1888
 Protoadapis brachyrhynchus Stehlin, 1912
 Protoadapis curvicuspidens Lemoine, 1878
 Protoadapis ignoratus Thalmann, 1994
 Protoadapis muechelnensis Thalmann, 1994
 Protoadapis recticuspidens Lemoine, 1878
 Protoadapis weigelti Gingerich, 1977
 Pronycticebus Grandidier, 1904
 Pronycticebus gaudryi Grandidier, 1904
 Pronycticebus neglectus Thalmann et al., 1989
 Asiadapidae Rose et al., 2009
 Anthrasimias Bajpai et al., 2008
 Anthrasimias gujaratensis Bajpai et al., 2008
 Asiadapis Rose et al., 2007
 Asiadapis cambayensis Rose et al., 2007
 Asiadapis tapiensis Rose et al., 2018
 Marcgodinotius Bajpai et al., 2005
 Marcgodinotius indicus Bajpai et al., 2005
 Adapidae Trouessart, 1879
 Adapinae Trouesart, 1879
 Adapis Cuvier, 1821
 Adapis bruni
 Adapis collinsonae Hooker, 1986
 Adapis parisiensis de Blainville, 1841
 Adapis sudrei Gingerich, 1977
 Cryptadapis Godinot, 1984
 Cryptadapis laharpei Godinot, 1984
 Cryptadapis tertius Godinot, 1984
 Leptadapis Gervais, 1876
 Leptadapis assolicus
 Leptadapis filholi Godinot & Couette, 2008
 Leptadapis capellae Crusafont-Pairo, 1967
 Leptadapis leenhardti Stehlin, 1912
 Leptadapis magnus Filhol, 1874
 Leptadapis ruetimeyeri Stehlin, 1912
 Magnadapis Godinot & Couette, 2008
 Magnadapis quercyi Godinot & Couette, 2008
 Magnadapis fredi Godinot & Couette, 2008
 Magnadapis laurenceae Godinot & Couette, 2008
 Magnadapis intermedius Godinot & Couette, 2008
 Microadapis Szalay, 1974
 Microadapis lynnae
 Microadapis sciureus Stehlin, 1916
 Palaeolemur Delfortrie, 1873
 Palaeolemur betillei Delfortrie, 1873
 Paradapis Tattersall & Schwartz 1983
 Paradapis ruetimeyeri Stehlin 1912
 Paradapis priscus Stehlin, 1916
 Caenopithecinae Szalay & Delson 1979
 Adapoides Beard et al., 1994
 Adapoides troglodytes Beard et al., 1994
 Afradapis Seiffert et al., 2009
 Afradapis longicristatus Seiffert et al., 2009
 Aframonius Simons et al., 1995
 Aframonius diedes Simons et al., 1995
 Caenopithecus Rütimeyer, 1862
 Caenopithecus lemuroides Rütimeyer, 1862
 Darwinius Franzen et al., 2009
 Darwinius masillae Franzen et al., 2009
 Europolemur Weigelt, 1933
 Europolemur dunaifi Tattersall & Schwartz, 1983
 Europolemur klatti Weigelt, 1933
 Europolemur koenigswald Franzen, 1987
 Godinotia Franzen, 2000
 Godinotia neglecta Thalmann, Haubold & Martin, 1989
 Mahgarita Wilson & Szalay, 1976
 Mahgarita stevensi Wilson & Szalay, 1976
 Masradapis Seiffert, Boyer, Fleagle, Gunnell, Heesy, Perry, Sallam, 2017
 Masradapis tahai Seiffert, Boyer, Fleagle, Gunnell, Heesy, Perry, and Sallam, 2017
 Mescalerolemur Kirk & Williams, 2011
 Mescalerolemur horneri Kirk & Williams, 2011
 Sivaladapidae Thomas & Verma, 1979
 Ramadapis Gilbert, Patel, Singh, Campisano, Fleagle, Rust, and Patnaik, 2017
 Ramadapis sahnii Gilbert, Patel, Singh, Campisano, Fleagle, Rust, and Patnaik, 2017
 Sivaladapinae Thomas & Verma, 1979
 Indraloris Lewis, 1933
 Indraloris himalayensis Pilgrim, 1932
 Indraloris kamlialensis Flynn and Morgan, 2005
 Sinoadapis Wu & Pan, 1985
 Sinoadapis carnosus Wu & Pan, 1985
 Sivaladapis Gingerich & Sahni, 1979
 Sivaladapis nagrii Prasad, 1970
 Sivaladapis palaendicus Pilgrim, 1932
 Hoanghoniinae Gingerich et al., 1994
 Hoanghonius Zdansky, 1930
 Hoanghonius stehlini Zdansky, 1930
 Lushius Chow, 1961
 Lushius qinlinensis Chow, 1961
 Rencunius Gingerich et al., 1994
 Rencunius zhoui Gingerich et al., 1994
 Wailekia Ducrocq et al., 1995
 Wailekia orientale Ducrocq et al., 1995
 incertae sedis
 Guangxilemur Qi & Beard, 1998
 Guangxilemur tongi Qi & Beard, 1998
 Kyitchaungia Beard et al. 2007
 Kyitchaungia takaii Beard et al. 2007
 Laomaki Ni et al. 2016
 Laomaki yunnanensis Ni et al. 2016
 Paukkaungia Beard et al. 2007
 Paukkaungia parva Beard et al. 2007
 Siamoadapis Chaimanee et al., 2007
 Siamoadapis maemohensis Chaimanee et al., 2007
 Yunnanadapis Ni et al. 2016
 Yunnanadapis folivorus Ni et al. 2016
 Yunnanadapis imperator Ni et al. 2016

Infraorder Chiromyiformes 
 Daubentoniidae Gray, 1863
 Daubentonia É. Geoffroy Saint-Hilaire, 1795
 Daubentonia robusta Lamberton, 1934
Plesiopithecidae Simons and Rasmussen, 1994
 Plesiopithecus Simons, 1992
 Plesiopithecus teras Simons, 1992
Propottidae Butler, 1984
 Propotto Simpson, 1967
 Propotto leakeyi Simpson, 1967

Infraorder Lemuriformes

Basal stem group Lemuriformes 
Family Azibiidae Gingerich, 1976
 Algeripithecus Godinot & Mahboubi, 1992
 Algeripithecus minutus Godinot & Mahboubi, 1992
 Azibius Sudre, 1975
 Azibius trerki Sudre, 1975
Djebelemuridae Hartenberger and Marandat, 1992
 unnamed ('Anchomomys')
 'Anchomomys' milleri Simons, 1997
 Djebelemur Hartenberger and Marandat, 1992
 Djebelemur martinezi Hartenberger & Marandat, 1992
 Namaia Pickford et al., 2008
 Namaia bogenfelsi Pickford et al., 2008
 Omanodon Gheerbrant et al., 1993
 Omanodon minor Gheerbrant et al., 1993
 Shizarodon Gheerbrant et al., 1993
 Shizarodon dhofarensis Gheerbrant et al., 1993
Plesiopithecidae Simons and Rasmussen, 1994
 Plesiopithecus Simons, 1992
 Plesiopithecus teras Simons, 1992

Lemuroidea 
Subfossil lemurs:

 Archaeolemuridae G. Grandier, 1905
 Archaeolemur Filhol, 1895
 Archaeolemur edwardsi Filhol, 1895
 Archaeolemur majori Filhol, 1895
 Hadropithecus Lorenz von Liburnau, 1899
 Hadropithecus stenognathus Lorenz von Liburnau, 1899
 Palaeopropithecidae Tattersall, 1973
 Mesopropithecus Standing, 1905
 Mesopropithecus dolichobrachion Simons et al., 1995
 Mesopropithecus globiceps Lamberton, 1936
 Mesopropithecus pithecoides Standing, 1905
 Babakotia Godfrey et al., 1990
 Babakotia radofilai Godfrey et al., 1990
 Palaeopropithecus G. Grandidier, 1899
 Palaeopropithecus ingens G. Grandidier, 1899
 Palaeopropithecus kelyus Gommery et al., 2010
 Palaeopropithecus maximus Standing, 1903
 Archaeoindris Standing, 1909
 Archaeoindris fontoynontii Standing, 1909
 Megaladapidae Forsyth-Major, 1894
 Megaladapis Forsyth-Major, 1894
 Subgenus: Megaladapis
 Megaladapis (Megaladapis) grandidieri Standing, 1903
 Megaladapis (Megaladapis) madagascariensis Forsyth-Major, 1894
 Subgenus: Peloriadapis
 Megaladapis (Peloriadapis) edwardsi Grandidier, 1899
 Lemuridae Gray, 1821
 Pachylemur Lamberton, 1946
 Pachylemur insignis Filhol, 1895
 Pachylemur jullyi Lamberton, 1948

Lorisiformes 
 Lorisidae Gray, 1821
 Karanisia Seiffert et al., 2003
 Karanisia clarki Seiffert et al., 2003
 Mioeuoticus Leakey, 1962
 Mioeuoticus bishopi Leakey, 1962
 Mioeuoticus kichotoi Kunimatsu, Tsujikawa, Nakatsukasa, Shimizu, Ogihara, Kikuchi, Nakano, Takano, Morimoto, and Ishida, 2017
 Mioeuoticus shipmani Phillips & Walker, 2000
 Nycticeboides Jacobs, 1981
 Nycticeboides simpsoni Jacobs, 1981
 Galagidae Gray, 1825
 Galago Geoffroy, 1796
 Galago farafraensis Pickford, Wanas & Soliman, 2006
 Galago howelli Wesselman, 1984
 Galago sadimanensis Walker, 1987
 Komba Simspon, 1967
 Komba minor Le Gros Clark & Thomas, 1952
 Komba robustus Le Gros Clark & Thomas, 1952
 Komba winamensis McCrossin, 1992
 Progalago MacInnes, 1943
 Progalago dorae MacInnes, 1943
 Progalago songhorensis Simpson, 1967
 Saharagalago Seiffert et al., 2003
 Saharagalago misrensis Seiffert et al., 2003
 Wadilemur Simons, 1997
 Wadilemur elegans Simons, 1997

Haplorhini 
 Teilhardina Simpson, 1940
 Teilhardina asiatica Ni et al., 2004
 Teilhardina belgica (Teilhard de Chardin, 1927)

Tarsiiformes

Tarsiiformes, incertae sedis
 Altanius Dashzeveg & McKenna, 1977
 Altanius orlovi Dashzeveg & McKenna, 1977
 Altiatlasius Sigé et al., 1990
 Altiatlasius koulchii Sigé et al., 1990

Archicebidae  

 Archicebus Ni et al., 2013
 Archicebus achilles Ni et al., 2013

Omomyoidea 
 Omomyidae Trouessart, 1879
 Baataromomys Ni, Beard, Meng, Wang, and Gebo, 2007
 Baataromomys ulaanus Ni, Beard, Meng, Wang, and Gebo, 2007
 Kohatius Russell & Gingerich, 1980
 Kohatius coppensi Russell & Gingerich, 1980
 Microchoerinae Lydekker, 1887
 Melaneremia Hooker, 2007
 Melaneremia bryanti Hooker, 2007
 Microchoerus Wood, 1846
 Microchoerus creechbarrowensis Hooker, 1986
 Microchoerus edwardsi Filhol, 1880
 Microchoerus erinaceus Wood, 1846
 Microchoerus hookeri Minwer-Barakat, Marigó, Femenias-Gual, Costeur, Esteban-Trivigno, and Moyà-Solà, 2017
 Microchoerus ornatus Stehlin, 1916
 Microchoerus wardi Hooker, 1986
 Necrolemur Filhol, 1873
 Necrolemur anadoni Minwer-Barakat, Marigó & Moyà-Solà, 2015
 Necrolemur antiquus Filhol, 1873
 Necrolemur zitteli Schlosser, 1887
 Nannopithex Stehlin, 1916
 Nannopithex filholi Chantre & Gaillard, 1897
 Nannopithex humilidens Thalmann, 1994
 Nannopithex quaylei Hooker, 1986
 Nannopithex raabi Heller, 1930
 Nannopithex zuccolae Godinot et al., 1992
 Pseudoloris Stehlin, 1916
 Pseudoloris crusafonti Louis & Sudre, 1975
 Pseudoloris godinoti Köhler & Moyà-Solà, 1999
 Pseudoloris isabenae Crusafont-Pairo, 1967
 Pseudoloris parvulus Filhol, 1890
 Anaptomorphinae Cope, 1883
 Tribe: Anaptomorphini
 Anaptomorphus Cope, 1872
 Anaptomorphus aemulus Cope, 1872
 Anaptomorphus westi Szalay, 1976
 Tetonius Matthew, 1915
 Tetonius homunculus Cope, 1882
 Tetonius matthewi Bown & Rose, 1987
 Tetonius mckennai Bown & Rose, 1987
 Absarokius Matthew, 1915
 Absarokius abbotti Loomis, 1906
 Absarokius australis Bown & Rose, 1987
 Absarokius nocerai Robinson, 1966
 Absarokius metoecus Bown & Rose, 1987
 Absarokius witteri Morris, 1954
 "Teilhardina" Simpson, 1940
 Teilhardina brandti Gingerich, 1993
 "Teilhardina" demissa Rose, 1995
 "Teilhardina" gingerichi Rose, Chew, Dunn, Kraus, Fricke, and Zack, 2012
 "Teilhardina" tenuicula Jepsen, 1930
 Bownomomys Morse et al., 2018
 Bownomomys americanus (Bown, 1976)
 Bownomomys crassidens )Bown & Rose, 1987)
 Anemorhysis Gazin, 1958
 Anemorhysis natronensis Beard et al., 1992
 Anemorhysis pattersoni Bown & Rose, 1984
 Anemorhysis pearcei Gazin, 1962
 Anemorhysis savagei Williams & Covert, 1994
 Anemorhysis sublettensis Gazin, 1952
 Anemorhysis wortmani Bown & Rose, 1984
 Chlororhysis Gazin, 1958
 Chlororhysis incomptus Bown & Rose, 1984
 Chlororhysis knightensis Gazin, 1958
 Pseudotetonius Bown, 1974
 Pseudotetonius ambiguus Bown, 1974
 Arapahovius Savage & Waters, 1978
 Arapahovius advena Bown & Rose, 1991
 Arapahovius gazini Savage & Waters, 1978
 Aycrossia Bown, 1979
 Aycrossia lovei Bown, 1979
 Strigorhysis Bown, 1979
 Strigorhysis bridgerensis Bown, 1979
 Strigorhysis huerfanensis Bown & Rose, 1987
 Strigorhysis rugosus Bown, 1979
 Gazinius Bown, 1979
 Gazinius amplus Bown, 1979
 Gazinius bowni Gunnell, 1995
 Tatmanius Bown & Rose, 1991
 Tatmanius szalayi Bown & Rose, 1991
 Tribe: Trogolemurini
 Trogolemur Matthew, 1909
 Trogolemur amplior Beard et al., 1992
 Trogolemur fragilis Beard et al., 1992
 Trogolemur myodes Matthew, 1909
 Sphacorhysis Gunnell, 1995
 Sphacorhysis burntforkensis Gunnell, 1995
 Walshina López-Torres, Silcox, and Holroyd, 2018
 Walshina esmaraldensis López-Torres, Silcox, and Holroyd, 2018
 Walshina mcgrewi (Robinson, 1968)
 Walshina shifrae (Krishtalka, 1978)
 Omomyinae Trouessart, 1879
 Brontomomys Atwater and Kirk, 2018
 Brontomomys cerutti Atwater and Kirk, 2018
 Diablomomys Williams and Kirk, 2008
 Diablomomys dalquesti Williams and Kirk, 2008
 Ekwiiyemakius Atwater and Kirk, 2018
 Ekwiiyemakius walshi Atwater and Kirk, 2018
 Gunnelltarsius Atwater and Kirk, 2018
 Gunnelltarsius randalli Atwater and Kirk, 2018
 Tribe: Omomyiini
 Omomys Leidy, 1869
 Omomys carteri Leidy, 1869
 Omomys lloydi Gazin, 1958
 Steinius Bown & Rose, 1984
 Steinius annectens Bown & Rose, 1991
 Steinius vespertinus Matthew, 1915
 Chumashius Stock, 1933
 Chumashius balchi Stock, 1933
 Tribe: Washakiini
 Washakius Leidy, 1873
 Washakius insignis Leidy, 1873
 Washakius izetti Honey, 1990
 Washakius laurae Simpson, 1959
 Washakius woodringi Stock, 1938
 Shoshonius Granger, 1910
 Shoshonius bowni Honey, 1990
 Shoshonius cooperi Granger, 1910
 Dyseolemur Stock, 1934
 Dyseolemur pacificus Stock, 1934
 Loveina Simpson, 1940
 Loveina minuta Loomis, 1906
 Loveina wapitiensis Gunnell et al., 1992
 Loveina zephyri Simspon, 1940
 Tribe: Utahiini
 Utahia Gazin, 1958
 Utahia carina Muldoon and Gunnell, 2002
 Utahia kayi Gazin, 1958
 Stockia Gazin, 1958
 Stockia powayensis Gazin, 1958
 Chipetaia Rasmussen, 1996
 Chipetaia lamporea Rasmussen, 1996
 Asiomomys Wang & Li, 1990
 Asiomomys changbaicus Wang & Li, 1990
 Tribe: Ourayiini
 Wyomomys Gunnell, 1995
 Wyomomys bridgeri Gunnell, 1995
 Ageitodendron Gunnell, 1995
 Ageitodendron matthewi Gunnell, 1995
 Ourayia Gazin, 1958
 Ourayia hopsoni Robinson, 1968
 Ourayia uintensis Osborn, 1895
 Tribe: Macrotarsiini
 Macrotarsius Clark, 1941
 Macrotarsius jepseni Robinson, 1968
 Macrotarsius macrorhysis Beard et al., 1994
 Macrotarsius montanus Clark, 1941
 Macrotarsius roederi Kelly, 1990
 Macrotarsius siegerti Robinson, 1968
 Hemiacodon Marsh, 1872
 Hemiacodon casamissus Beard et al., 1992
 Hemiacodon gracilis Marsh, 1872
 Yaquius Mason, 1990
 Yaquius travisi Mason, 1990
 Tribe: Uintaniini
 Uintanius Matthew, 1915
 Uintanius ameghini Wortman, 1904
 Uintanius rutherfurdi Robinson, 1966
 Jemezius Beard, 1987
 Jemezius szalayi Beard, 1987
 Tribus: Rooneyini
 Rooneyia Wilson, 1966
 Rooneyia viejaensis Wilson, 1966
 Tarsiidae Gray, 1825
 Hesperotarsius Zijlstra, Flynn, and Wessels, 2013
 Hesperotarsius sindhensis Zijlstra, Flynn, and Wessels, 2013
 Hesperotarsius thailandicus (Ginsburg & Mein, 1987)
 Oligotarsius Ni et al., 2016
 Oligotarsius rarus Ni et al., 2016
 Tarsius Storr, 1780
 "Tarsius" eocaenus Beard et al., 1994
 "Tarsius" sirindhornae Chaimanee et al., 2011
 Xanthorhysis Beard, 1998
 Xanthorhysis tabrumi Beard, 1998

Eosimiiformes

Afrotarsiidae
Afrasia Chaimanee et al. 2012
Afrasia djijidae Chaimanee et al. 2012
 Afrotarsius Simons & Bown, 1985
 Afrotarsius chatrathi Simons & Bown, 1985
 Afrotarsius libycus Jaeger et al., 2010

Eosimiidae
 Eosimias Beard et al., 1994
 Eosimias centennicus Beard et al., 1996
 Eosimias sinensis Beard et al., 1994
 Bahinia Jaeger et al., 1999
 Bahinia banyueae Li et al., 2016
 Bahinia pondaungensis Jaeger et al., 1999
 Phileosimias Marivaux, Antoine, Baqri, Benammi, and Chaimanee, 2005
 Phileosimias brahuiorum Marivaux, Antoine, Baqri, Benammi, and Chaimanee, 2005
 Phileosimias kamali Marivaux, Antoine, Baqri, Benammi, and Chaimanee, 2005
 Phenacopithecus Beard and Wang, 2004
 Phenacopithecus krishtalkai Beard and Wang, 2004
 Phenacopithecus xueshii Beard and Wang, 2004

Simiiformes

Simiiformes, incertae sedis
 Amphipithecidae Godinot, 1994
 Pondaungia Pilgrim, 1927
 Pondaungia cotteri Pilgrim, 1927
 Amphipithecus Colbert, 1937
 Amphipithecus mogaungensis Colbert, 1937
 Krabia Chaimanee et al., 2013
 Krabia minuta Chaimanee et al., 2013
 Siamopithecus Chaimanee et al., 1997
 Siamopithecus eocaenus Chaimanee et al., 1997
 Proteopithecidae Simons, 1997
 Proteopithecus Simons, 1989
 Proteopithecus sylviae Simons, 1989
 Serapia Simons, 1992
 Serapia eocaena Simons, 1992
 Parapithecidae Schlosser, 1911
 Arsinoea Simons, 1992
 Arsinoea kallimos Simons, 1992
 Apidium Osborn, 1908
 Apidium bowni Simons, 1995
 Apidium moustafai Simons, 1962
 Apidium phiomense Osborn, 1908
 Parapithecus Schlosser, 1910
 Parapithecus fraasi Schlosser, 1910
 Parapithecus grangeri Simons, 1974
 Qatrania Simons & Kay, 1983
 Qatrania fleaglei Simons & Kay, 1988
 Qatrania wingi Simons & kay, 1983
 Biretia Bonis et al., 1988
 Biretia piveteaui Bonis et al., 1988
 Biretia fayumensis Seiffert et al., 2005
 Biretia megalopsis Seiffert et al., 2005

Platyrrhini
Platyrrhini, incertae sedis
 Branisella Hoffstetter, 1969
 Branisella boliviana Hoffstetter, 1969
 Atelidae Gray, 1825
 Pitheciinae Mivart, 1865
 Tribus: Callicebini
 Xenothrix Williams & Koopman, 1952
 Xenothrix mcgregori Williams & Koopman, 1952
 Antillothrix MacPhee et al., 1995
 Antillothrix bernensis Rímoli, 1977
 Paralouatta Rivero & Arredondo, 1991
 Paralouatta varonai Rivero & Arredondo, 1991
 Paralouatta marianae
 Tribus: Pitheciini
 Soriacebus Fleagle et al., 1987
 Soriacebus adrianae Fleagle, 1990
 Soriacebus ameghinorum Fleagle et al., 1987
 Proteropithecia Kay et al., 1999
 Proteropithecia neuquenensis Kay et al., 1998
 Cebupithecia Stirton & Savage, 1951
 Cebupithecia sarmientoi Stirton & Savage, 1951
 Nuciruptor Meldrum & Kay, 1997
 Nuciruptor rubricae Meldrum & Kay, 1997
 Tribus: Homunculini
 Homunculus Ameghino, 1891
 Homunculus patagonicus Ameghino, 1891
 Carlocebus Fleagle, 1990
 Carlocebus carmenensis Fleagle, 1990
 Carlocebus intermedius Fleagle, 1990
 Atelinae Gray, 1825
 Tribus: Alouattini
 Stirtonia Hershkovitz, 1970
 Stirtonia tatacoensis Stirton, 1951
 Stirtonia victoriae Kay et al., 1987
 Tribus: Atelini
 Caipora Cartelle & Hartwig, 1996
 Caipora bambuiorum Cartelle & Hartwig, 1996
 Atelinae, incertae sedis
 Protopithecus Lund, 1838
 Protopithecus brasiliensis Lund, 1838
 Cebidae Bonaparte, 1831
 Cebinae Bonaparte, 1831
 Tribus: Saimiriini
 Neosaimiri Stirton, 1951
 Neosaimiri fieldsi Stirton, 1951
 Laventiana Rosenberger et al., 1991
 Laventiana annectens Rosenberger et al., 1991
 Dolichocebus Kraglievich, 1951
 Dolichocebus gaimanensis Kraglievich, 1951
 Cebinae, incertae sedis
 Chilecebus Flynn & al, 1995
 Chilecebus carrascoensis Flynn & al, 1995
 Killikaike Tejedor et al., 2006
 Killikaike blakei Tejedor et al., 2006
 Aotinae Elliot, 1913
 Aotus Illiger, 1811
 Aotus dindensis Setoguchi & Rosenberger, 1987
 Aotinae, incertae sedis
 Tremacebus Hershkovitz, 1974
 Tremacebus harringtoni Rusconi, 1933
 Callitrichinae Thomas, 1903
 Tribus: Callimiconi
 Mohanamico Luchterhand et al., 1986
 Mohanamico hershkovitzi Luchterhand et al., 1986
 Callitrichinae, incertae sedis
 Patasola Kay & Meldrum, 1997
 Patasola magdalenae Kay & Meldrum, 1997
 Lagonimico Kay, 1994
 Lagonimico conclutatus Kay, 1994
 Micodon Setoguchi & Rosenberger, 1985
 Micodon kiotensis Setoguchi & Rosenberger, 1985

Catarrhini

Catarrhini, incertae sedis

Limnopithecus Hopwood, 1933
 Limnopithecus evansi MacInnes, 1943
 Limnopithecus legetet Hopwood, 1933
 Kalepithecus Harrison, 1988
Kalepithecus songhorensis Andrews, 1978
Kalepithecus kogolensis Pickford et al., 2017
 Kamoyapithecus Leakey et al., 1995
 Kamoyapithecus hamiltoni Madden, 1980
 Kogolepithecus Pickford et al., 2003
 Kogolepithecus morotoensis Pickford et al., 2003

Propliothecoidea
 Oligopithecidae Kay & Williams, 1994
 Catopithecus Simons, 1989
 Catopithecus browni Simons, 1989
 Oligopithecus Simons, 1962
 Oligopithecus rogeri Gheerbrant et al., 1995
 Oligopithecus savagei Simons, 1962
 Talahpithecus Jaeger et al., 2010
 Talahpithecus parvus Jaeger et al., 2010
 Propliopithecidae Straus, 1961
 Moeripithecus Schlosser, 1910
 Moeripithecus markgrafi Schlosser, 1910
 Propliopithecus Schlosser, 1910
 Propliopithecus ankeli Simons et al., 1987
 Propliopithecus chirobates Simons, 1965
 Propliopithecus haeckeli Schlosser, 1910
 Aegyptopithecus Simons, 1965
 Aegyptopithecus zeuxis Simons, 1965

Pliopithecoidea
 Pliopithecidae Zapfe, 1960
 Lomorupithecus Rossie and MacLatchy, 2006
 Lomorupithecus harrisoni Rossie and MacLatchy, 2006
 Dionysopithecinae
 Dionysopithecus Li, 1978
 Dionysopithecus orientalis Suteethorn et al., 1990
 Dionysopithecus shuangouensis Li, 1978
 Platodontopithecus Li, 1978
 Platodontopithecus jianghuaiensis Li, 1978
 Pliopitheciinae
 Epipliopithecus Zapfe & Hurzeler, 1957
 Epipliopithecus vindobonensis Zapfe & Hurzeler, 1957
 Pliopithecus Gervais, 1849
 Pliopithecus antiquus Gervais, 1849
 Pliopithecus piveteaui Hürzeler, 1954
 Pliopithecus platyodon Bidermann, 1863
 Pliopithecus zhanxiangi Harrison et al., 1991
 Egarapithecus Moyà-Solà et al., 2001
 Egarapithecus narcisoi Moyà-Solà et al., 2001
 Crouzeliinae Ginsburg & Mein, 1980
 Plesiopliopithecus Zapfe, 1961
 Plesiopliopithecus auscitanensis Bergounioux & Crouzel, 1965
 Plesiopliopithecus lockeri Zapfe, 1961
 Plesiopliopithecus priensis Welcomme et al., 1991
 Plesiopliopithecus rhodanica Ginsburg & Mein, 1980
 Anapithecus Kretzoi, 1975
 Anapithecus hernyaki Kretzoi, 1975
 Laccopithecus Wu & Pan, 1984
 Laccopithecus robustus Wu & Pan, 1984
Pliopithecoidea, incertae sedis
 Paidopithex Pohlig, 1895
 Paidopithex rhenanus Pohlig, 1895

Dendropithecoidea
 Dendropithecidae Harrison, 2002
 Dendropithecus Andrews & Simons, 1977
 Dendropithecus macinnesi Le Gros Clark & Leakey, 1950
 Dendropithecus ugandensis Pickford et al., 2010
 Micropithecus Fleagle & Simons, 1978
 Micropithecus clarki Fleagle & Simons, 1978
 Micropithecus leakeyorum Harrison, 1989
 Simiolus Leakey & Leakey, 1987
 Simiolus andrewsi Harrison, 2010
 Simiolus cheptumoae Pickford & Kunimatsu, 2005
 Simiolus enjiessi Leakey & Leakey, 1987
 Simiolus minutus Rossie & Hill, 2018

Saadanioidea
 Saadaniidae Zalmout et al., 2010
 Saadanius Zalmout et al., 2010
 Saadanius hijazensis Zalmout et al. 2010

Cercopithecoidea
 Nsungwepithecus Stevens et al., 2013
 Nsungwepithecus gunnelli Stevens et al., 2013 
 Victoriapithecidae von Koenigswald, 1969
 Victoriapithecus von Koenigswald, 1969
 Victoriapithecus macinnesi von Koenigswald, 1969
 Prohylobates Fourtau, 1918
 Prohylobates tandyi Fourtau, 1918
 Prohylobates simonsi Delson, 1979
 Noropithecus Miller et al. 2009
 Noropithecus bulukensis Miller et al. 2009
 Cercopithecidae Gray, 1821
 Colobinae Jernon, 1867
 Tribus: Colobini
 Microcolobus Benefit & Pickford, 1986
 Microcolobus tugenensis Benefit & Pickford, 1986
 Rhinocolobus M.G. Leakey, 1982
 Rhinocolobus turkanaensis M.G. Leakey, 1982
 Colobinae, incertae sedis
 Mesopithecus Wagner, 1839
 Mesopithecus pentelicus Wagner, 1839
 Mesopithecus monspessulanus Gervais, 1849
 Mesopithecus sivalensis (Lydekker, 1878)
 Myanmarcolobus Takai et al., 2015
 Myanmarcolobus yawensis Takai et al., 2015
 Rhinopithecus É. Geoffroy Saint-Hilaire, 1812
 Subgenus: Rhinopithecus É. Geoffroy Saint-Hilaire, 1812
 Rhinopithecus (Rhinopithecus) lantianensis Hu & Qi, 1978
 Dolichopithecus Depéret, 1889
 Dolichopithecus ruscinensis Depéret, 1889
 Libypithecus Stromer, 1913
 Libypithecus markgrafi Stromer, 1913
 Semnopithecus Desmarest, 1822
 Semnopithecus gwebinnensis Takai et al., 2016
 Parapresbytis Kalmykov & Maschenko, 1992
 Parapresbytis eohanuman (Borissoglebskaya, 1981)
 Cercopithecoides Mollett, 1947
 Cercopithecoides kimeui M.G. Leakey, 1982
 Cercopithecoides williamsi Mollett, 1947
 Paracolobus R.E.F. Leakey, 1969
 Paracolobus chemeroni R.E.F. Leakey, 1969
 Paracolobus mutiwa M.G. Leakey, 1969
 Cercopithecinae Gray, 1821
 Tribus: Papionini
 Subtribus: Macanina
 Macaca Lacépède, 1799
 Macaca anderssoni Schlosser, 1924
 Macaca florentina Cocchi, 1872
 Macaca jiangchuanensis Pan et al., 1992
 Macaca libyca Stromer, 1920
 Macaca majori Schaub & Azzaroli in Comaschi Caria, 1969 (sometimes included in M. sylvanus)
 ?Macaca palaeindicus (Lydekker, 1884)
 Procynocephalus Schlosser, 1924
 Procynocephalus subhimalayanus von Meyer, 1848
 Procynocephalus wimani Schlosser, 1924
 Paradolichopithecus Necrasov et al., 1961
 Paradolichopithecus arvernensis (Depéret, 1929)
 Subtribus: Papionina
 Parapapio Jones, 1937
 Parapapio ado Hopwood, 1936
 Parapapio broomi Jones, 1937
 Parapapio jonesi Broom, 1940
 Parapapio whitei Broom, 1940
 Parapapio lothagamensis Leakey, Teaford, and Ward, 2003
 Procercocebus Gilbert, 2007
 Procercocebus antiquus (Haughton, 1925)
 Dinopithecus Broom, 1937
 Dinopithecus ingens Broom, 1937
 Gorgopithecus Broom & Robinson, 1946
 Gorgopithecus major Broom, 1940
 Theropithecus I. Geoffroy Saint-Hilaire, 1843
 Subgenus: Theropithecus Delson, 1993
 Theropithecus (Theropithecus) darti Broom & Jensen, 1946
 Theropithecus (Theropithecus) oswaldi Andrews, 1916
 Subgenus: Omopithecus Delson, 1993
 Theropithecus (Omopithecus) baringensis R.E.F. Leakey, 1969
 Theropithecus (Omopithecus) brumpti Arambourg, 1947
 Soromandrillus Gilbert, 2013
 Soromandrillus quadratirostris (Iwamoto, 1982)
 Papio Erxleben, 1777
 Papio izodi Gear, 1926
 Papio robinsoni Freedman, 1957

Hominoidea
 Hominoidea, incertae sedis
 Otavipithecus Conroy et al., 1992
 Otavipithecus namibiensis Conroy et al., 1992

 Proconsulidae Leakey, 1963
 Proconsulinae Leakey, 1963
 Ekembo McNulty et al., 2015
 Ekembo heseloni (Walker et al., 1993)
 Ekembo nyanzae (Le Gros Clark & Leakey, 1950)
 Proconsul Hopwood, 1933
 Proconsul africanus Hopwood, 1933
 Proconsul gitongai (Pickford and Kunimatsu, 2005)
 Proconsul major Le Gros Clark & Leakey, 1950
 Proconsul meswae Harrison and Andrews, 2009
 Nyanzapithecinae Harrison, 2002
 Nyanzapithecus Harrison, 1986
 Nyanzapithecus alesi Nengo, Tafforeau, Gilbert, Fleagle, Miller, Feibel, Fox, Feinberg, Pugh, Berruyer, Mana, Engle, Spoor, 2017 
 Nyanzapithecus harrisoni Kunimatsu, 1997
 Nyanzapithecus pickfordi Harrison, 1986
 Nyanzapithecus vancouveringorum Andrews, 1974
 Mabokopithecus von Koenigswald, 1969
 Mabokopithecus clarki von Koenigswald, 1969
 Oreopithecus Gervais, 1872
 Oreopithecus bamboli Gervais, 1872
 Rukwapithecus Stevens et al., 2013
 Rukwapithecus fleaglei Stevens et al., 2013 
 Rangwapithecus Andrews, 1974
 Rangwapithecus gordoni Andrews, 1974
 Turkanapithecus Leakey & Leakey, 1986
 Turkanapithecus kalakolensis Leakey & Leakey, 1986

 Pliobatidae Alba et al., 2015
 Pliobates Alba et al., 2015
 Pliobates cataloniae Alba et al., 2015
 Afropithecidae Begun, 2002
 Griphopithecinae Begun, 2002
 Griphopithecus Abel, 1902
 Griphopithecus alpani Tekkaya, 1974
 Griphopithecus suessi Abel, 1902
 Afropithecinae Andrews, 1992
 Afropithecus Leakey & Leakey, 1986
 Afropithecus turkanensis Leakey & Leakey, 1986
 Heliopithecus Andrews & Martin, 1987
 Heliopithecus leakeyi Andrews & Martin, 1987
 Nacholapithecus Ishida et al., 1999
 Nacholapithecus kerioi Ishida et al., 1999
 Equatorius Ward et al., 1999
 Equatorius africanus  (Le Gros Clark and Leaky, 1950)
 Hominidae Gray, 1825
 Kenyapithecinae Leakey, 1962
 Kenyapithecus Leakey, 1962
 Kenyapithecus wickeri Leakey, 1962
 Ponginae Elliot, 1913
 Sivapithecini
 Sivapithecus Pilgrim, 1910
 Sivapithecus indicus Pilgrim, 1910
 Sivapithecus parvada Kelley, 1988
 Sivapithecus sivalensis Lydekker, 1879
 Gigantopithecus von Koenigswald, 1935
 Gigantopithecus blacki von Koenigswald, 1935
 Gigantopithecus giganteus Pilgrim, 1915
 Ankarapithecus Ozansoy, 1965
 Ankarapithecus meteai Ozansoy, 1965
 Lufengpithecini
 Lufengpithecus Wu, 1987
 Lufengpithecus chiangmuanensis Chaimanee et al., 2003
 Lufengpithecus hudiensis Zhang et al., 1987
 Lufengpithecus keiyuanensis Woo, 1957
 Lufengpithecus lufengensis Xu et al., 1978
 Homininae Gray, 1825
 Dryopithecini Gregory & Hellman, 1939
 Ouranopithecus Bonis & Melentis, 1977
 Ouranopithecus macedoniensis Bonis & Melentis, 1977
 Rudapithecus Kretzoi, 1969
 Rudapithecus hungaricus Kretzoi, 1969
 Hispanopithecus Villalta & Crusafont, 1944
 Hispanopithecus laietanus Villalta & Crusafont, 1944
 Hispanopithecus crusafonti (Begun, 1992)
 Pierolapithecus Moyà-Solà, 2004
 Pierolapithecus catalaunicus Moyà-Solà, 2004
 Anoiapithecus Moyà-Solà et al., 2009
 Anoiapithecus brevirostris Moyà-Solà et al., 2009
 Dryopithecus Lartet, 1856
 Dryopithecus wuduensis Xue & Delson, 1988
 Dryopithecus fontani Lartet, 1856
 Nakalipithecus Kunimatsu et al. 2007
 Nakalipthecus nakayamai Kunimatsu et al. 2007
 Neopithecus Abel, 1902
 Neopithecus brancoi (Schlosser, 1901)
 Gorillini
 Samburupithecus Ishida & Pickford, 1997
 Samburupithecus kiptalami Ishida & Pickford, 1997
 Chororapithecus Suwa et al., 2007
 Chororapithecus abyssinicus Suwa et al., 2007
 Hominini
 Graecopithecus von Koenigswald, 1972
 Graecopithecus freybergi von Koenigswald, 1972
 Sahelanthropus Brunet et al., 2002
 Sahelanthropus tchadensis Brunet et al., 2002
 Orrorin Senut et al., 2001
 Orrorin tugenensis Senut et al., 2001
 Ardipithecus White et al., 1995
 Ardipithecus ramidus White et al., 1994
 Ardipithecus kadabba
 Australopithecus Dart, 1925 - paraphyletic in respect to Paranthropus and Homo
 Australopithecus anamensis Leakey et al., 1995
 Australopithecus afarensis Johanson et al., 1978
 Australopithecus bahrelghazali Brunet et al., 1995
 Australopithecus africanus Dart, 1925
 Australopithecus garhi Asfaw et al., 1999
 Australopithecus sedibaBerger et al., 2010
 Paranthropus Broom, 1938
 Paranthropus aethiopicus Arambourg & Coppens, 1968
 Paranthropus boisei Leakey, 1959
 Paranthropus robustus Broom, 1938
 Homo Linnaeus, 1758
 Homo gautengensis Curnoe, 2010
 Homo rudolfensis Alexeev, 1986
 Homo habilis Leakey et al., 1964
 Homo luzonensis Détroit et al., 2019
 Homo erectus Dubois, 1892
 Homo floresiensis P. Brown et al., 2004
 Homo ergaster Groves & Mazak, 1975
 Homo antecessor Bermúdez de Castro et al., 1997
 Homo heidelbergensis Schoetensack, 1908
 Homo cepranensis Mallegni et al., 2003
 Homo neanderthalensis King, 1864
 Homo rhodesiensis Woodward, 1921
 Homo naledi Berger et al., 2015
 Kenyanthropus Leakey et al., 2001
 Kenyanthropus platyops Leakey et al., 2001

See also 
 Evolution of primates
 List of fossil primates of South America
 List of fossil sites
 List of human evolution fossils
 List of prehistoric mammals
 Prehistoric Autopsy (2012 BBC documentary)

Notes

References

Literature cited

Further reading

External links
Interactive map of fossil finds
 (note: the catalogue loads with pages in reverse order - i.e. last page first)

 
Fossil primates